The fifteenth and final season of the American fictional drama television series ER premiered on September 25, 2008, and concluded on April 2, 2009, in a two-hour episode preceded by a one-hour retrospective special. It consists of 22 episodes.

Plot

The final season opens up revealing Gregory Pratt is the victim of the ambulance explosion. Despite the rallying efforts of his workplace colleagues, he succumbs to his injuries and dies. The season introduces Cate Banfield as new ER chief, a woman with a seemingly mysterious past with County General. Luka Kovač and Abby Lockhart leave for a new life in Boston, Brenner must deal with issues surrounding his childhood, and he comes to a crossroads in his relationship with Neela, Samantha Taggart and Tony Gates' relationship suffers a major setback after an accident involving Alex Taggart while Neela Rasgotra is forced to make some tough decisions, both personal and professional.

To mark the end of the series after 15 years, several former cast members make a return to the show. Mark Greene and Robert Romano appear in a flashback episode that explores Banfield's history with County General while John Carter returns to work at County although, unbeknown to his colleagues, he is in desperate need of a kidney transplant. Peter Benton, Doug Ross, Carol Hathaway, Susan Lewis, Elizabeth Corday, Kerry Weaver and Ray Barnett return in various episodes. The series ends with one final multiple casualty incident that brings multiple patients to the ER, and shows that life goes on at County General.

Cast

Main cast
 Anthony Edwards as Dr. Mark Greene (in flashback only)
 Noah Wyle as Dr. John Carter
 Laura Innes as Dr. Kerry Weaver
 George Clooney as Dr. Doug Ross
 Julianna Margulies as Nurse Carol Hathaway
 Sherry Stringfield as Dr. Susan Lewis
 Goran Visnjic as Dr. Luka Kovač
 Maura Tierney as Dr. Abby Lockhart, Attending Physician
 Mekhi Phifer as Dr. Greg Pratt, Attending Physician
 Alex Kingston as Dr. Elizabeth Corday
 Eriq La Salle as Dr. Peter Benton
 Parminder Nagra as Dr. Neela Rasgotra, Third Year Surgical Resident
 John Stamos as Dr. Tony Gates, Third Year Resident
 Linda Cardellini as Nurse Samantha Taggart
 Scott Grimes as Dr. Archie Morris, Attending Physician
 David Lyons as Dr. Simon Brenner, Attending Physician
 Angela Bassett as Dr. Catherine Banfield, Chief of Emergency Medicine

Special appearances
The final season included special appearances by departed main and recurring cast members:

 Shane West as Dr. Ray Barnett
 Laura Innes as Dr. Kerry Weaver
 Paul McCrane as Dr. Robert Romano (in flashback only)
 Alex Kingston as Dr. Elizabeth Corday

Returning recurring characters
 William H. Macy as Dr. David Morgenstern
 Ellen Crawford as Nurse Lydia Wright
 Hallee Hirsh as Rachel Greene
 Thandiwe Newton as Makemba "Kem" Likasu
Matthew Watkins as Reese Benton

Supporting

Doctors and medical students
 Amy Aquino as Dr. Janet Coburn, Chief of Obstetrics
 John Aylward as Dr. Donald Anspaugh, Chief of Staff
 Leland Orser as Dr. Lucien Dubenko, Chief of Surgery
 J. P. Manoux as Dr. Dustin Crenshaw, Surgical Attending Physician
 Gina Ravera as Dr. Betina DeJesús, Radiologist
 Michael Buchman Silver as Dr. Paul Meyers, Psychiatrist
 Shiri Appleby as Dr. Daria Wade, ER Intern
 Julian Morris as Dr. Andrew Wade, Surgical Intern
 Victor Rasuk as Dr. Ryan Sánchez, ER Intern
 Emily Rose as Dr. Tracy Martin, ER Intern
 Sam Jones III as Chaz Pratt, First Year Medical Student/Part Time EMT
 Alexis Bledel as Dr. Julia Wise, ER Intern
 Gil McKinney as Dr. Paul Grady, Second Year ER Resident
 Bresha Webb as Dr. Laverne St. John, ER Intern
 Julia Jones as Dr. Kaya Montoya, ER Intern
 Perry Anzilotti as Dr. Ed, Anesthesiologist

Nurses
 Deezer D as Nurse Malik McGrath
 Laura Cerón as Nurse Chuny Marquez
 Yvette Freeman as Nurse Haleh Adams
 Lily Mariye as Nurse Lily Jarvik
 Dinah Lenney as Nurse Shirley
 Nasim Pedrad as Nurse Suri
 Angel Laketa Moore as Nurse Dawn Archer
 Mary Heiss as Nurse Mary
 Mónica Guzmán as Nurse Marisol

Staff, paramedics and officers
 Abraham Benrubi as Desk Clerk Jerry Markovic
 Troy Evans as Desk Clerk Frank Martin
 Tara Karsian as Social Worker Liz Dade
 Emily Wagner as Paramedic Doris Pickman
 Montae Russell as Paramedic Dwight Zadro
 Lyn Alicia Henderson as Paramedic Pamela Olbes
 Brian Lester as Paramedic Brian Dumar
 Demetrius Navarro as Paramedic Morales
 Louie Liberti as Paramedic Bardelli
 Brendan Patrick Connor as Paramedic Reidy
 Justina Machado as Officer Claudia Diaz
 Christopher Amitrano as Officer Hollis
 Demetrius Grosse as Officer Newkirk
 Eddie B. Smith as Officer Jones

Family
 Chloe Greenfield as Sarah Riley
 Courtney B. Vance as Russell Banfield
 Ellaraino as Marie Banfield
 Daylon Adkison as Daryl Banfield (in flashback only)
 Dominic Janes as Alex Taggart
 Amy Madigan as Mary Taggart
 Shannon Woodward as Kelly Taggart
 Andrew Gonzales and Aidan Gonzales as Joe Kovač
 Kasey Mahaffy as Johnny Morris

Notable guest stars
 Chadwick Boseman as Derek Taylor
 Carl Weathers as Louie Taylor
 Garry Marshall as Harry Feingold
 Debra Mooney as Barbara Feingold
 Christa B. Allen	as Jody Nugent
 Louis Gossett Jr. as Leo Malcolm
 Ariel Winter as Lucy Moore
 Wallace Shawn as Teddy Lempell
 Judy Greer as Tildie Mulligan
 Susan Sarandon as Nora
 Rooney Mara as Megan
 Ernest Borgnine as Paul Manning
 Tom Arnold as The Big Kahuna
 Marilu Henner as Linda

Production

Crew
 Christopher Chulack – Executive producer
 Michael Crichton – Creator/Executive producer
 John Wells – Executive producer
 David Zabel – Executive producer
 Joe Sachs – Executive producer
 Janine Sherman Barrois – Executive producer
 Lisa Zwerling – Co-executive producer
 Tommy Burns – Producer
 Wendy Spence Rosato – Producer
 Charles M. Lagola – Production designer
 Arthur Albert – Director of photography
 Martin Davich – Music
 Randy Jon Morgan, A.C.E. – Editor
 Mimi Leder, a frequent director during ER first two seasons, returned as a director for the episode "A Long, Strange Trip"
 Rod Holcomb, the director of the 1994 pilot episode as well as several other early episodes, returned to direct two episodes in this season, among them the series finale
 Paul McCrane, recurring cast member seasons 4 and 5, and series regular seasons 6–10, continues his affiliation with the show as director of two episodes this season

Episodes

References

External links 
 

2008 American television seasons
2009 American television seasons
Iraq War in television
ER (TV series) seasons